Wolong may refer to:

People

 Wolong, an alternative name for Zhuge Liang, Chinese politician in Three Kingdoms
 Wolong Sheng, pen name of Niu Heting (1930–1997), Chinese author

Places
 Wolong Gang, the former residence of Zhuge Liang in Nanyang, Henan
 Wolong District, Nanyang, Henan
 Wolong National Nature Reserve, Sichuan
 Wolong Special Administrative Region, Sichuan

Wolong Town
 Wolong, Benxi, in Mingshan District, Benxi, Liaoning
 Wolong, Hebei, in Pingquan, Hebei
 Wolong, Xiangyang, in Xiangcheng District, Xiangyang, Hubei
 Wolong, Qionglai, a town in Wenchuan County, Sichuan
 Wolong, Wenchuan County, in Wenchuan County, Sichuan
 Wolong Street, a street in Daan District, Taipei, Taiwan, with a portion transferred to Heping Road in March 2012

Other uses
 Wolong company, a manufacturer of industrial motors